John Addenbrooke (1680 – 7 June 1719) was an English medical doctor who left more than £4,500 in his will for the founding of a hospital for the poor. Addenbrooke's Hospital, which has expanded significantly since its beginnings, is now a major teaching hospital in Cambridge, England.

Addenbrooke studied at Catharine Hall, now St Catharine's College, a part of the University of Cambridge. He was later a fellow and bursar there, and bequeathed a collection of rare medical books to the college library.

Notes

References

1680 births
1719 deaths
Alumni of St Catharine's College, Cambridge
English philanthropists
Fellows of St Catharine's College, Cambridge
18th-century British philanthropists